Nobber ( – referring to the description by the local native Irish population, to the development of moat around a Norman castle) is a village in north County Meath, Ireland. The village is located near a river called the Dee and near Whitewood Lake, which is situated in the townland of Whitewood. The town of Kells is to the west and the town of Ardee to the east and the town of Kingscourt is to the north. Villages that border the parish are Kilmainhamwood, Moynalty and Kilbeg to the west, Castletown-Kilpatrick to the south and Drumconrath and Lobinstown to the east.

The village of Nobber is built on the river Dee, the course of which was diverted around the village in the 19th century. A feature of the local geography is how the village is set within rolling hills called drumlins formed in the last glacial period.

History

The Normans were the first known people to settle at Nobber. The site acted as a strong-point on the road from the ports of Drogheda and Dundalk to the midlands. The Lordship of Meath was granted to Hugh De Lacy by King Henry II of England in 1172 in his capacity as Lord of Ireland. De Lacy granted the Barony of Morgallion to Gilbert de Angulo, who constructed a motte and bailey there.
By the middle of the 15th century Nobber was described by the English King Henry VI as being of key strategic importance to the control of the region. Around 2005 several high crosses were discovered in the village's old cemetery (St Johns) dating from possibly the 10th century. 
These are smaller and less ornate than typical Celtic high crosses. This find is significant because it suggests that a hitherto unrecorded monastic settlement once existed on the site of the village.  Moynagh Lake, to the west of the village, is the site of a multi-period crannóg which dates to Mesolithic times. In the Medieval period, Nobber was the chief town of the Barony of Morgallion, and was variously expressed as "".
By the time of the Acts of Union 1800 - 1801, the local population was sufficient to command an MP for Nobber in the parliament of Great Britain and Ireland.

Archdeacon of Nobber 

Nobber was once a key town in the Kingdom of Meath, and an ancient 'Rectory of Nobber' was united to the ecclesiastical dignity of Archdeacon of Kells, thus the holder was styled Rector of Nobber, Parson of Nobber, or more often 'Archdeacon of Nobber'. Confusingly, the Archdeacon of Kells held the Rectory of Nobber, while the Archdeacon of Meath held the Rectory of Kells.

Transport

Rail
A disused railway line dating from 1875, running from Kingscourt to Navan, runs through the village. This was purchased by the Midland Great Western Railway in 1888. Until recent years it operated to haul gypsum from Saint-Gobain Gypsum Industries plant  in County Cavan to the port of Drogheda. Nobber railway station opened on 1 November 1872, closed for passenger traffic on 27 January 1947 and finally closed altogether on 1 April 1963.

Greenway
A major phase of the Navan to Kingscourt Greenway was developed and opened for the Nobber locality in Summer 2020. This follows the track of the old railway line from Navan to Kingscourt. This extends from Spiddeal at the south of the village extending toward, but not yet reaching Kilmainhamwood.

Bus
Bus Éireann route 107 links Nobber to Navan and Kingscourt. Sillan also provide a link to Navan and Dublin with some buses extending to University College Dublin. In the other direction Sillan services provide a link to Kingscourt, Shercock and Cootehill.

Amenities
The village has two schools: Nobber National school for primary school children and O'Carolan College which is a comprehensive secondary school. The church of Saint John the Baptist is the Roman Catholic church in the centre of the village which also has a fire station, Garda Síochána (police) station.

In July 2016 the George Eogan Cultural Centre was opened by the President of Ireland, Mr Michael D. Higgins in Nobber in the old Protestant Church.

In the media
The local radio station serving Nobber is LMFM, and the local newspaper is the Meath Chronicle. In 2019 an eponymous historical fiction novel entitled Nobber was published by the author Oisin Fagan the author of Hostages, set in the village of Nobber in the 14th century during plague times.

Sport
Nobber has only one Gaelic Football team called Nobber G.F.C. In 2003, Nobber won the All-Ireland Junior Club Football Championship, beating Kilmeena of Mayo. Nobber are three time Meath Intermediate Football Champions, having won honours in 1980, 2010 and 2019. Having won the 2019 Meath Intermediate Football Championship, as of 2020, Nobber compete in the Meath Senior Football Championship.

The local soccer team are Electro Celtic FC who (as of 2012) were competing in Division 3B of the Meath and District League.

Festivals and events
The Nobber Fair Day is an annual event that is held on the third Sunday of May. The event has been running since 2006, and revived an old tradition of a fair that was held in the village for centuries. Rare breeds of farm animals are displayed, and rosettes and prizes are awarded across various categories. In 2012, more than 10,000 people attended Nobber Fair Day.

People
 Turlough O'Carolan, blind harpist reputed to have been born in Nobber - there is a statue in memory of him at the southern end of the village
 Shane McEntee (1956–2012), Fine Gael TD and Minister of State
 George Eogan, archaeologist known for his work at Knowth

See also
List of towns and villages in Ireland

References

Bibliography

External links
 O'Carolan College

Towns and villages in County Meath